The Junior Eurovision Song Contest 2012 was the tenth edition of the annual Junior Eurovision Song Contest. It took place at the Heineken Music Hall in Amsterdam, Netherlands on 1 December 2012. Dutch broadcaster AVRO was the host broadcaster for the event. For the second time the Netherlands hosted the contest, after hosting the contest in 2007 in Rotterdam. The show was hosted by  Kim-Lian van der Meij for a second time, this time joined by Ewout Genemans. The motto for the contest was "Break The Ice".

Twelve countries took part in the contest, making it the smallest number of countries participating in the Junior Eurovision Song Contest history, and equalling the number of countries participated in the 1970 Eurovision Song Contest held at RAI Congrescentrum. Israel, Albania and Azerbaijan made their debuts at the Junior Eurovision Song Contest. Whilst nine countries from the previous edition continued their participation in the contest, four countries withdrew: Lithuania, Bulgaria, Latvia and Macedonia. The contest was won by Anastasiya Petryk for Ukraine with the song "Nebo".  and  finished in second and third place, respectively. This was Ukraine's first Junior Eurovision victory and second Eurovision victory after Ruslana won the 2004 Eurovision Song Contest in Istanbul. Ukraine's winning margin of 35 points was also a record.

Location 

On 11 October 2011, the European Broadcasting Union (EBU) announced that the Dutch broadcaster AVRO had won the right to host next year's event. On 27 February 2012, it was announced that the tenth edition of the contest would take place on 1 December and be held at the Heineken Music Hall (or commonly abbreviated as HMH) in Amsterdam.

The Heineken Music Hall was specially designed for music shows, several artists like Madonna and Kylie Minogue made shows at the venue. Furthermore, it is often used by the Dutch Entertainment Company Q-dance for the Event-Series X-Qlusive taking place several times a year. The big hall (also called Black Box) has been used for concerts and boasts a capacity of 5,500 and is 3000 m². After parties are given in a smaller hall, with a capacity of 700.

Format

Presenters

In January 2012, it was announced that Ewout Genemans alongside Junior Eurovision Song Contest 2007 co-host Kim-Lian van der Meij would present the contest later in the year. Genemans had been involved with the contest for the past two years, having hosted the Dutch national selection for the contest, Junior Songfestival in 2010 and 2011. In December 2011, Genemans signed a 2 year exclusivity deal with the host broadcaster to present shows only on their station. Dutch entertainer and singer Kim Lian reprised her role as host again, after hosting the contest from the Ahoy Arena in 2007 alongside Sipke Jan Bousema.

Logo and graphic design
The architect was Frits van Dongen. The motto for the contest was announced on 6 September 2012 as "Break The Ice". Tickets for the contest went on sale from 10 September 2012.

Opening and interval acts
The show was opened with the song "Euphoria" from Loreen performed by 2011 Dutch representative Rachel Traets. During the interval Kim-Lian van der Meij, who specially written "Break the Ice" as the theme song for this contest, performed on stage whilst all the participants sang "We Can Be Heroes" to promote children’s rights worldwide in cooperation with the Dutch charity, KidsRights Foundation and the 2009 winner Ralf Mackenbach performed also.

Participating countries
On 1 September 2012, the EBU announced that twelve countries would take part in the 2012 contest. Albania, Azerbaijan, and Israel made their debut at the 10th edition, while Bulgaria, Latvia, Lithuania, and Macedonia withdrew from participation.

Returning artists
One confirmed representative had been announced as returning to the contest for a second time. Lerika who participated Moldova in 2011 finishing in 6th place with the song "No, No", represented Russia this time around, finishing in 4th place.

Participants and results

Detailed voting results 

Due to technical issues, Georgia was the final country to cast its votes.

12 points 
Below is a summary of all 12 points received. All countries were given 12 points at the start of voting to ensure that no country finished with nul points.

Spokespersons 

The order in which votes were cast during the 2012 contest along with the spokesperson who was responsible for announcing the votes for their respective country.

 Ralf Mackenbach
 Maria Drozdova
 Leya Gullström
 Leila Hajili
 Femke Verschueren
 Valentin Sadiki
 Maayan Aloni
 Keida Dervishi
 Michael Varosyan
 Kristall
 Felcia Genunchi
 Lidewei Loot
 Candy

Other countries
On 11 June 2012, Bulgarian National Television (BNT) confirmed that Bulgaria would not be taking part in the 2012 contest.
The Cyprus Broadcasting Corporation (CyBC) confirmed to esckaz.com in Baku that Cyprus would not be returning to the Junior Eurovision Song Contest in 2012.
In mid June 2012, Yleisradio (Yle) confirmed to esckaz.com that they would not be debuting at the 2012 contest. They did however say they were open to taking part in the future.
In July 2011, the EBU confirmed that Italian broadcaster Radiotelevisione italiana (RAI) were interested in making a debut at the 2011 contest.  But a delay in negotiations meant that this would not be the case, and that Italy would certainly secure a place in 2012, if their desire to participate was still on the agenda.
On 27 June 2012, Latvijas Televīzija (LTV) confirmed to esckaz.com that Latvia would not be taking part in the 2012 contest. The reason for withdrawal was not given, however it's believed that financial issues caused the withdrawal.
On 27 June 2012, Lithuanian National Radio and Television (LRT) confirmed to esckaz.com that Lithuania would not be taking part in 2012 contest. The Lithuanian Head of Delegation said, the withdrawal was due to the expense of broadcasting the 2012 Summer Olympics and 2012 UEFA European Football Championship leaving no budget for participation in 2012.
On 13 July 2012, Macedonian Radio-Television (MKRTV) confirmed to esckaz.com that they would not be taking part in the 2012 contest. They said this was due to issues with the way voting is held and the lack of budget for the contest.
In early June 2012, Norsk rikskringkasting (NRK) confirmed that Norway would not return to the contest, this is due to a rule change that the EBU made in 2006, that allowed professional singers to take part.
In early June 2012, Rádio e Televisão de Portugal (RTP) were approached by the EBU to take part in the 2012 contest. RTP declined due to financial difficulties.
San Marino RTV had originally planned to debut in the 2011 contest, but later withdrew their application in order to concentrate on their preparation for the Eurovision Song Contest 2012 instead. San Marino RTV has announced on 22 August 2012 that they would not take part in 2012 contest. 
When Serbia withdrew from the 2011 contest, the head of delegation said that a one-year break would be okay, for financial reasons and that hopefully they would in 2012, in order to "not disappoint the Serbian kids". However, the country didn't participate.
Website esckaz.com asked Spanish broadcaster Televisión Española (TVE) about their participation in future editions. TVE was not able to give an affirmative or negative response on their participation in 2012.

Broadcasts 

Each national broadcaster sent a commentator to the contest, in order to provide coverage of the contest in their own native language. Details of the commentators and the broadcasting station for which they represented are also included in the table below.

Official album

Junior Eurovision Song Contest Amsterdam 2012, is a compilation album put together by the European Broadcasting Union, and was released by Universal Music Group on November 2012. The album features all the songs from the 2012 contest, along with karaoke versions.

See also
 ABU Radio Song Festival 2012
 ABU TV Song Festival 2012
 Eurovision Song Contest 2012
 Eurovision Young Musicians 2012

Notes

References

External links

 

 
2012
2012 in the Netherlands
2010s in Amsterdam
2012 song contests
December 2012 events in Europe
Events in Amsterdam